The Democrats (Demokraterna) is a local political party in the city of Gothenburg, represented in the city council since the 2018 elections with 14 (out of 81) seats, the largest after the Social Democrats. The party was formed as a cross-party coalition in 2017  by former Moderate Martin Wannholt, aimed at halting construction of the West Link, a major railroad tunnel construction set to be completed in 2026. 

 After the 2018 local elections, the Democrats held negotiations with the centre-right Alliance parties aimed at forming a coalition, which collapsed when the Democrats refused to budge on its central question and the coalition parties refused to consider dropping the project.

References

Minor political parties in Sweden
2017 establishments in Sweden
Political parties established in 2017